Ørjasæter is a surname. Notable people with the surname include:

Elin Ørjasæter (born 1962), Norwegian children's writer, columnist, non-fiction writer and lecturer
Tordis Ørjasæter (born 1927), Norwegian literary critic, biographer, former professor of educational science, and novelist
Tore Ørjasæter (1886–1968), Norwegian educator, literature critic and poet